Megan Gustafson (born December 13, 1996) is an American basketball player for the Phoenix Mercury of the Women's National Basketball Association (WNBA). Gustafson was drafted in the second round (17th overall) by the Dallas Wings in the 2019 WNBA draft, but was released before the start of the season. On June 10, 2019, she was signed again by the team that had previously cut her.

Gustafson completed her college career with the Iowa Hawkeyes in 2019. As a senior, she scored 1000 points that year and won the Honda Sports Award as the nation's top female basketball player. On March 15, 2019, ESPN named Gustafson the national player of the year. In 2018 and 2019, Gustafson was named the Big Ten Conference Women's Basketball Player of the Year. Gustafson is from Port Wing, Wisconsin and played for South Shore High School.

On January 26, 2020, Iowa retired Gustafson's number 10.

Iowa statistics

Source

WNBA career statistics

Regular season

|-
|style="text-align:left;"| 2019
| style="text-align:left;"| Dallas
| 25 || 0 || 9.5 || .491|| .111 || .900 || 2.5 || 0.3 || 0.2 || 0.2 || 0.4 || 2.9
|-
|style="text-align:left;"| 2020
| style="text-align:left;"| Dallas
| 10 || 0 || 4.8 || .286 || .000 || .667 || 1.1 || 0.1 || 0.0 || 0.1 || 0.2 || 1.4
|-
| style='text-align:left;'|2021
| style='text-align:left;'|Washington
| 11 || 1 || 9.9 || .594 || .000 || .667 || 3.6 || 0.0 || 0.2 || 0.1 || 0.8 || 4.0
|-
| style='text-align:left;'|2022
| style='text-align:left;'|Phoenix
| 33 || 0 || 9.6 || .549 || .462 || .765 || 1.9 || 0.5 || 0.2 || 0.2 || 0.7 || 3.9
|-
| style='text-align:left;'| Career
| style='text-align:left;'| 4 years, 3 teams
| 79 || 1 || 9.0 || .521 || .342 || .782 || 2.3 || 0.3 || 0.2 || 0.2 || 0.6 || 3.2

Playoffs

|-
| style='text-align:left;'|2022
| style='text-align:left;'|Phoenix
| 2 || 0 || 23.5 || .316 || .000 || 1.000 || 4.5 || 2.0 || 0.5 || 0.5 || 0.5 || 9.0
|-
| style='text-align:left;'| Career
| style='text-align:left;'| 1 year, 1 team
| 2 || 0 || 23.5 || .316 || .000 || 1.000 || 4.5 || 2.0 || 0.5 || 0.5 || 0.5 || 9.0

See also 
 List of NCAA Division I women's basketball career scoring leaders
 List of NCAA Division I women's basketball career rebounding leaders
 List of NCAA Division I women's basketball career field-goal percentage leaders
 List of NCAA Division I women's basketball players with 2,500 points and 1,000 rebounds
 List of NCAA Division I women's basketball season scoring leaders

References

External links
Iowa Hawkeyes bio

1996 births
Living people
All-American college women's basketball players
American women's basketball players
Basketball players from Minnesota
Basketball players from Wisconsin
Big Ten Athlete of the Year winners
Centers (basketball)
Dallas Wings draft picks
Dallas Wings players
Iowa Hawkeyes women's basketball players
People from Bayfield County, Wisconsin
Olympiacos Women's Basketball players
Phoenix Mercury players
Power forwards (basketball)
Sportspeople from Duluth, Minnesota
Washington Mystics players